The Statue of Albert, Prince Consort, also known as The Albert Memorial, is a Category B listed monument at the North Inch public park in Perth, Perth and Kinross, Scotland. It is dedicated to Prince Albert of Saxe-Coburg and Gotha, husband of Queen Victoria.

The Queen unveiled the statue on 30 August, 1864, three years after Albert's death, on her way to Balmoral Castle. The couple and their children had stayed at the city's Royal George Hotel in 1848. It was their first time staying in a hotel, an occurrence prompted by their inability to stay at nearby Scone Palace because William Murray, 4th Earl of Mansfield, was out of town.

He is dressed in the robes of the Knight of the Thistle and holding a plan of the Crystal Palace. It faces south, onto Charlotte Street.

Detail

See also
List of listed buildings in Perth, Scotland

References

External links
Albert, Prince Consort, Statue To, North Inch – Historic Environment Scotland listing

Monuments and memorials to Albert, Prince Consort
1864 sculptures
1864 establishments in Scotland
Listed buildings in Perth, Scotland
Category B listed buildings in Perth and Kinross
Listed monuments and memorials in Scotland
Outdoor sculptures in Scotland
Statues in Scotland
Sandstone sculptures